The Heart of a Child is a 1915 British silent drama film directed by Harold M. Shaw and starring Edna Flugrath, Edward Sass and Hayford Hobbs. It is based on a 1908 novel by Frank Danby.

A later remake of Danby's story appeared in 1920 starring Alla Nazimova.

Plot
A girl from the slums is injured by an aristocrat's car. Years later, now a successful dancer, she falls in love with the aristocrat's brother.

Cast
 Edna Flugrath - Sally Snape
 Edward Sass - Lord Kidderminster
 Hayford Hobbs - Lord Gilbert
 Mary Dibley - Lady Dorothea Lytham
 George Bellamy - Mr. Peastone
 Douglas Munro - Joe Aarons
 Frank Stanmore - Johnny Doone
 Gwynne Herbert - Lady Fortive
 Christine Rayner ...  Mary
 Lewis Gilbert - Bill Snape
 Anna Godfrey - Mrs. Snape
 Stanley Burton - Johnny's Brother

References

External links

1915 films
British silent feature films
1915 drama films
Films directed by Harold M. Shaw
Films based on British novels
British drama films
British black-and-white films
1910s English-language films
1910s British films
Silent drama films